Antoni Sosnowski (born 1 June 1946 in Żmiarki) is a Polish politician. He was elected to the Sejm on 25 September 2005, getting 5,537 votes in 32 Sosnowiec district as a candidate from the League of Polish Families list.

See also
Members of Polish Sejm 2005-2007

External links
Antoni Sosnowski - parliamentary page - includes declarations of interest, voting record, and transcripts of speeches.

1946 births
Living people
People from Parczew County
League of Polish Families politicians
Members of the Polish Sejm 2005–2007